Sazaa is a 1972 Indian Hindi-language action thriller film, produced by S.K. Kapur under the Kapur Films banner and directed by Chand. It stars Ashok Kumar, Pran, Kabir Bedi, Yogeeta Bali  while Jeetendra, Rekha have given special appearances and music  composed by Sonik Omi.

Plot
Aggrieved by the murder of wife and daughter during his absence, a Barrister-at-Law becomes voluntarily an investigator by posing himself as one of the criminals. He confronts an equally tough adversary who, in the end, is exposed and punished.

Cast
Ashok Kumar as Barrister Raghuveer Sahay / Jagdish Prasad "Jaggu"  
Pran as CBI Inspector Verma / Sohanlal
Kabir Bedi as Brijmohan
Yogeeta Bali as Suman Verma
Madan Puri as Shankar
Jeetendra as Dancer (Special Appearance)
Rekha as Courtesan (Special Appearance) 
Helen as Kitty
Rajendra Nath as Ramu / Ramchandra Gonsalves    
Chandrashekhar as Inspector Sinha
Mehmood Junior as Ramu's son
M. B. Shetty as Raka
Rajan Haksar as Sultan   
Kamaldeep as Pinto
Faryal as Cabaret Dancer
Sonia Sahni as Geeta Sahay

Soundtrack

External links

References

1972 films
1970s Hindi-language films
1970s action thriller films
Films scored by Sonik-Omi
Indian action thriller films